Nangar is a national park in located New South Wales, Australia,  west of Sydney. The park is located in the Nangar-Murga Range between Eugowra and Canowindra.

Trees consist of eucalyptus, blackpine, scribbly gum and ironbark. Shrubs include spider flowers, thyme spurge, nodding blue lily and waxlip orchids.

Birds recorded include wrens, thornbills, falcons, hawks, peregrine falcons and glossy black cockatoos. Eastern grey kangaroos and grey, redneck and swamp wallabies are common.

The park was originally established in 1983 when 1,550 hectares of bushland were declared a national park. "Dripping Rock" was added to the park in 1988 and, in 1994, the Nangar State Forest was added to the park to expand its size to 9,196 hectares. "Dripping Rock" was a grazing property established in 1928 and named after a local seasonal waterfall. The original "Dripping Rock" homestead was converted to a shearing shed and a new homestead, built in 1935, was destroyed by a bushfire in September 2009.

See also
 Protected areas of New South Wales

References

External links 
  Page on NPWS official site

National parks of New South Wales
1983 establishments in Australia
City of Orange